"Fading Away" is a song by the Florida-based dance-pop group Will to Power. It appears on their 1988 self-titled debut album and was released as a single in early 1989.

The song reached #65 on the US pop chart in February 1989 and #84 on the UK Singles chart in March of that year. The song was more successful on dance charts in the US, reaching #2 on the Billboard Hot Dance Singles Sales chart and spending two weeks at top the Billboard Hot Dance Club Play chart. This was the group's second Hot Dance Club Play chart-topper, following "Say It's Gonna Rain" from 1988. Remixes for the track were done by Shep Pettibone.

Track listing

 U.S.A. 12 "Single

 UK 12 "Single

 The Netherlands 7 "Single

Charts

See also
List of number-one dance hits (United States)

References

1989 singles
Will to Power (band) songs
Epic Records singles
1988 songs